The Houston Cougars golf program is an NCAA Division I golf program at the University of Houston.  The men's program, under head coach Jonathan Dismuke, and the women's program, coached by Lydia Gumm, both compete in the American Athletic Conference.

Team members who went on to professional golf careers include Fuzzy Zoeller, Fred Couples, Steve Elkington, Nick Faldo, Bruce Lietzke, Billy Tuten, John Mahaffey, Bill Rogers, Blaine McCallister, Dave Marr, Fred Marti and Billy Ray Brown.  Future broadcaster Jim Nantz was also a member of the team.

The men's golf program is one of the oldest sports played at the University of Houston, as it began in 1946 along with the football program.  The team is one of the most successful college programs in history, with 16 team national championships and eight individual national championships.  This makes the team the second-most successful team of all time, behind only Yale.  The team also holds 20 conference championships and has produced 44 All-Americans.

References

External links
 Houston Cougars men's golf
 Houston Cougars women's golf
 American Athletic Conference – Golf

Houston Cougars golf
Houston Cougars men's golf
Houston Cougars men's golfers
1946 establishments in Texas